1961–62 Oberliga may refer to:

 1961–62 Oberliga, a West German association football season
 1961–62 DDR-Oberliga, an East German association football season
 1961–62 DDR-Oberliga (ice hockey) season, an East German ice hockey season